Microvirga ossetica is a Gram-negative bacterium from the genus of Microvirga which has been isolated from the nodules of the plant Vicia alpestris from North Ossetia.

References

External links
Type strain of Microvirga ossetica at BacDive -  the Bacterial Diversity Metadatabase

Hyphomicrobiales
Bacteria described in 2017